This is a list of religious organizations by faith.

As it can be a matter of debate as to whether an organization is in fact religious, organizations only appear on this list where the organization itself claims or has claimed to be a religious organization.

Buddhist organizations

International
International Buddhist Confederation
International Network of Engaged Buddhists
Sakyadhita International Association of Buddhist Women
World Buddhist Forum
World Buddhist Sangha Council
World Buddhist Scout Brotherhood
World Fellowship of Buddhists

Bangladesh
Bangladesh Bauddha Kristi Prachar Sangha

Europe
Buddhist Congregation Dharmaling (Slovenia)
Buddhist Federation of Norway
Buddhist Society (UK)
Deutsche Buddhistische Union
Diamond Way Buddhism
European Buddhist Union
Federación de Comunidades Budistas de España (Spain)
Finnish Buddhist Union
German Dharmaduta Society
Italian Buddhist Union
Network of Buddhist Organisations (UK)
Swedish Buddhist Community
Triratna Buddhist Community
Union Bouddhiste de France

Hong Kong
Hong Kong Buddhist Association

India
Bengal Buddhist Association
Buddhist Society of India

Japan
Reiyūkai
Risshō Kōsei Kai
Ryomo Kyokai
Soka Gakkai International

Ladakh
Ladakh Buddhist Association
Ladakh Nuns Association

Myanmar
Buddha Sāsana Nuggaha
International Meditation Centre
Pa-Auk Society
Young Men's Buddhist Association (Burma)

North Korea
Korea Buddhist Federation

People's Republic of China
Buddhist Association of China

Singapore
Buddhist Research Society
Singapore Buddhist Lodge
Ti-Sarana Buddhist Association
Vipassana Meditation Centre

South America
South America Hongwanji Mission

South Korea
Kwan Um School of Zen

Sri Lanka
Buddhist Publication Society
Maha Bodhi Society
Mahamevnawa Buddhist Monastery
Young Men's Buddhist Association

Taiwan
Buddha's Light International Association
Chung Tai Shan
Dharma Drum Mountain
Fo Guang Shan
Tzu Chi

Thailand
Dhamma Society Fund
Sangha Supreme Council

United States
American Zen Teachers Association
Buddhist Churches of America
Buddhist Global Relief
Buddhist Peace Fellowship
Buddhist Women's Association
Cambridge Buddhist Association 
Dharma Realm Buddhist Association
Foundation for the Preservation of the Mahayana Tradition
Insight Meditation Society
Plum Village Community of Engaged Buddhism
Soto Zen Buddhist Association
Young Buddhist Association
Zen Peacemakers
Zen Studies Society

Vietnam
Vietnam Buddhist Sangha
Vietnamese Buddhist Youth Association

Christian organizations

Christian organizations by denominational family affiliation

Adventist
Advent Christian Church
Adventist Church of Promise
Church of the Blessed Hope
Church of God General Conference
Creation Seventh Day Adventist Church
General Association of Davidian Seventh-day Adventists
General Conference Corporation of Seventh-day Adventists (Seventh-day Adventist Church)
List of Seventh-day Adventist colleges and universities
List of Seventh-day Adventist secondary schools
List of Seventh-day Adventist periodicals
Media ministries of the Seventh-day Adventist Church
General Conference of the Church of God (Seventh-Day)
International Missionary Society of Seventh-Day Adventist Church Reform Movement
Sabbath Rest Advent Church
SDARM General Conference (Adventist Reform Movement)
United Sabbath-Day Adventist Church
United Seventh-Day Brethren

Anabaptist

Anglican
 
List of Anglican dioceses
List of dioceses of the Anglican Church of Canada
List of dioceses of the Episcopal Church, United States
List of Anglo-Catholic churches
List of colleges and seminaries affiliated with the Episcopal Church
List of Anglican devotional societies

Baptist
 
List of Baptist schools in the United States
List of Baptist colleges and universities in the United Kingdom
List of Baptist colleges and universities in the United States

Catholic
 
 
List of Carthusian monasteries
List of Roman Catholic missions in Africa
Dioceses 
List of Roman Catholic dioceses (alphabetical)
List of Roman Catholic dioceses (structured view)
List of Roman Catholic archdioceses
List of French dioceses in the 19th and 20th century
Congregations
List of Roman Catholic churches in the Diocese of Charleston
List of parishes in the Roman Catholic Diocese of Fresno
List of parishes of the Roman Catholic Diocese of Honolulu
Parishes of the Apostolic Exarchate for Ukrainians in Great Britain
Parishes of the Apostolic Exarchate in Germany and Scandinavia for the Ukrainians
Orders and societies 
List of Ecclesial movements
Knights of Columbus
Knights of St. George
Schools 
List of Roman Catholic seminaries
List of Eastern Catholic seminaries
List of Catholic schools in the Philippines
Roman Catholic universities and colleges in the United States
List of independent Catholic schools in the United States
Other
American Catholic Philosophical Association
Catholic Biblical Federation

Christian Scientists

Church of Christ, Scientist
First Church of Christ, Scientist

Church of the East
 
Dioceses of the Church of the East
Dioceses of the Church of the East to 1318
Dioceses of the Church of the East, 1318–1552
Dioceses of the Church of the East after 1552
Ecclesiastical Provinces
Adiabene (East Syrian Ecclesiastical Province)
Beth Garmaï (East Syrian Ecclesiastical Province)
Beth Huzaye (East Syrian Ecclesiastical Province)
Maishan (East Syrian Ecclesiastical Province)
Nisibis (East Syrian Ecclesiastical Province)
Province of the Patriarch (East Syrian Ecclesiastical Province)
Fars (East Syrian Ecclesiastical Province)
Hulwan (East Syrian Ecclesiastical Province)
Merv (East Syrian Ecclesiastical Province)
Rai (East Syrian Ecclesiastical Province)
Salmas (Chaldean Archdiocese)
Shemsdin (East Syrian Ecclesiastical Province)

Eastern Orthodox
 
List of Eastern Orthodox dioceses and archdioceses
List of the dioceses of the Orthodox Church in America
Congregations
Orthodox parishes in the United States
List of Eastern Orthodox parishes in Alaska
Eastern Orthodoxy in Hawaii

Evangelical
 
List of evangelical seminaries and theological colleges

Lutheran
 
List of Lutheran denominations
List of Lutheran dioceses and archdioceses
Nordic churches in London
List of ELCA seminaries
Seminaries of the Lutheran Church - Missouri Synod

Methodist
 
List of African Methodist Episcopal Churches

Oriental Orthodox
 
List of Coptic Orthodox Churches in the United States
List of Coptic Orthodox Churches in Canada
List of Eritrean Orthodox monasteries

Oriental Orthodox dioceses
Seat of the Coptic Orthodox Pope of Alexandria
Coptic Diocese of Faras

Syriac Orthodox Church
Malabar Diocese (Malankara Orthodox Syrian Church)
Armenian Patriarch of Constantinople
Catholicos of Armenia
Holy See of Cilicia
Armenian Patriarch of Constantinople
Armenian Patriarchate of Jerusalem

Catholicos of the East and Malankara Metropolitan
Angamali West Orthodox Diocese
Angamaly Orthodox Diocese
Kolkata Orthodox Diocese
Syriac Orthodox Church
Dioceses of the Syriac Orthodox Church
Malankara Syriac Orthodox Church

Pentecostal

Presbyterian
 
List of Church of Scotland parishes

Protestant
List of the largest Protestant churches of the world
List of Protestant mission societies in Africa

Quaker
 
List of Friends schools

Reformed (Calvinist)
 
List of Calvinist educational institutions

Stone-Campbell movement
List of universities and colleges affiliated with the Churches of Christ
List of universities and colleges affiliated with the Christian churches and churches of Christ

Organizations of miscellaneous denominational families
List of Messianic Jewish organizations

Christian organizations by purpose

Bible societies

American Bible Society
Association of Theologically Trained Women of India
Bible Society In Australia
Bible Society in New Zealand
Bible Society NSW
Bible Society of India
British and Foreign Bible Society
Catholic Biblical Federation
Deutsche Bibelgesellschaft
Gideons International
Holman Bible Outreach International
International Bible Society

Jesus' Disciples
Japan Bible Society
Norwegian Bible Society
Pioneer Bible Translators
Pakistan Bible Society
Russian Bible Society
Scottish Bible Society
Society for Promoting Christian Knowledge
Society of Biblical Literature
Thailand Bible Society
Ukrainian Bible Society
United Bible Societies
Wycliffe Bible Translators

Humanitarian aid
World Vision International

Congregations by country
 
 

List of churches in Taungoo, Burma
Congregations in Canada
List of cathedrals in Canada
List of Ottawa churches
List of cathedrals in India
Congregations in France
List of basilicas in France
List of cathedrals in France
List of cathedrals in Ireland
Congregations in Italy
List of cathedrals in Italy
List of basilicas in Italy
List of churches in Florence
List of churches in Venice
List of churches in Malta
List of cathedrals in New Zealand
List of churches in Pakistan
List of churches in Moscow, Russia
List of churches in Sweden
Congregations in the United Kingdom
List of collegiate churches in England
List of collegiate churches in Scotland
List of cathedrals in the United Kingdom
List of churches in Bristol
List of churches in Cheshire
List of churches in Gloucestershire
List of churches in Greater Manchester
List of churches in Hampshire
List of churches in Harrogate
List of churches in Kent
List of churches in Lincolnshire
List of churches in London
List of churches in Oxford
List of churches in Salford
Congregations in the United States
List of churches that are National Historic Landmarks in the United States
List of churches in Philadelphia
List of cathedrals in the United States

Dioceses
List of Anglican dioceses
See List of religious organizations#Catholic
See List of religious organizations#Church of the East
List of Eastern Orthodox dioceses and archdioceses
List of Lutheran dioceses and archdioceses
See List of religious organizations#Oriental Orthodox

Christian media organizations

Mission organizations
 
 List of Christian mission hospitals
 List of Spanish missions
 Billy Graham Evangelistic Association
 Samaritan's Purse
 Team Expansion
 WEC International
 World Vision United States
 Youth With A Mission

Monasteries, abbeys, priories, and friaries
 
List of monasteries, abbeys, and priories

List of Christian religious houses in Austria
List of Christian religious houses in Belgium
List of Christian monasteries in Denmark
List of Christian religious houses in France
List of Benedictine monasteries in France
List of Cistercian monasteries in France
List of Premonstratensian monasteries in France
List of Christian religious houses in Germany
List of Christian religious houses in Brandenburg
List of Christian religious houses in Mecklenburg-Vorpommern
List of Christian religious houses in North Rhine-Westphalia
List of Christian religious houses in Saxony
List of Christian religious houses in Saxony-Anhalt
List of Christian religious houses in Schleswig-Holstein
List of Imperial abbeys
List of Christian religious houses in the Republic of Ireland
List of Christian monasteries in Norway
List of Christian monasteries in Sweden
List of Christian religious houses in Switzerland
List of Christian religious houses in Syria
Lists of Christian monasteries in the United Kingdom
List of abbeys and priories in England, (see also map link by county)
List of abbeys and priories in Scotland
List of abbeys and priories in Wales
List of abbeys and priories in Northern Ireland
List of abbeys and priories on the Isle of Man
List of monasteries dissolved by Henry VIII of England

Christian orders and societies

Christian political organizations

Christian relief organizations
 
International
Association of Gospel Rescue Missions
Samaritan's Purse
World Relief
World Vision
The Salvation Army
Cross International
Hospitals
List of Christian mission hospitals
List of Christian hospitals in China

Christian schools and colleges
 
 
Association of Christian Universities and Colleges in Asia
List of schools accredited by the Association of Theological Schools in the United States and Canada
List of SVD schools

Christian sports organizations

Christian trade unions and labor organizations
Christian Trade Union Federation of Germany
Christian Workers' Union
French Confederation of Christian Workers
Solidarity (South African trade union)
World Confederation of Labour
World Movement of Christian Workers
Young Christian Workers

Christian youth organizations

Miscellaneous Christian organizations
 
 
 

List of parachurch organizations
 Christian Vegetarian Association
 Society of Christian Philosophers
 Promise Keepers

Confucian organizations
Holy Confucian Church
Phoenix churches
Supreme Council for the Confucian Religion in Indonesia
Universal Church of the Way and its Virtue

Hindu organizations

Adi Brahmo Samaj & Sadharan Brahmo Samaj
Brahmo Conference Organisation
Rammohan College
World Brahmo Council
Akhil Bharatiya Akhara Parishad
Akhil Bharatiya Hindu Mahasabha
Akonir Namghar
All World Gayatri Pariwar
American Meditation Institute
Ananda Ashrama
Ananda Marga Pracaraka Samgha
Ananda World Brotherhood Colonies
Antarashtriya Hindu Parishad
Arsha Vidya Gurukulam
Art of Living Foundation
Arya Samaj
Arya Pratinidhi Sabha of Fiji
D.A.V. College Managing Committee
Gurukul Kangri University
Bharat Sevashram Sangha
Bhartiya Gau Raksha Dal
 Bochasanwasi Akshar Purushottam Swaminarayan Sanstha
Brahma Kumaris
Adhyatmik Ishwariya Vishwa Vidyalaya
Brahma Kumaris World Spiritual University
Chinmaya Mission
Devaswom boards in Kerala
Divine Life Society
Divine Light Mission
Gaudiya Math
Gaudiya Mission
Gita Press
Hanuman Foundation
Himalayan Institute of Yoga Science and Philosophy
Hindu Aikya Vedi
Hindu Army
Hindu American Foundation
Hindu Council of Russia
Hindu Dharmika Sena
Hindu Dharma Samudaya of Bhutan
Hindu Forum of Britain
Hindu Janajagruti Samiti
Hindu Maha Sabha (Fiji)
Hindu Munnani
Hindu Rights Action Force
Hindu Samhati
Hindu Sena
Hindu Students Council
Hindu Yuva Vahini
International Society for Krishna Consciousness
International Swaminarayan Satsang Mandal
International Swaminarayan Satsang Organisation
International Vedanta Society
Isha Foundation
Italian Hindu Union
Jagadguru Kripalu Parishat
Radha Madhav Dham
Jagadguru Kripaluji Yog
Kaginele Kanaka Guru Peetha
Kanchi Kamakoti Peetham
Malaysia Hindudharma Mamandram
Mata Amritanandamayi Math
Narnarayan Dev Yuvak Mandal
National Council of Hindu Temples
National Hindu Students' Forum
Nikhil Manipuri Hindu Mahasabha
Pakistan Hindu Council
Pakistan Hindu Panchayat
Parisada Hindu Dharma Indonesia
Patanjali Yogpeeth
Radha Soami Satsang Beas
Radha Soami Satsang Sabha
Radha Swami Satsang, Dinod
Ramakrishna Math (a.k.a. Vedanta Society)
Ramakrishna-Vivekananda Center
Vedanta Society of New York
Vedanta Society of Southern California
Ramakrishna Mission
Ramakrishna Mission Institute of culture
Swami Vivekananda Yoga Anusandhana Samsthana
Rashtriya Swayamsevak Sangh (a.k.a. Sangh Parivar)
Akhil Bharatiya Vidyarthi Parishad
Bajrang Dal
Bharat Vikas Parishad
Bharatiya Kisan Sangh
Bharatiya Mazdoor Sangh
Ekal Vidyalaya
Hindu Jagran Manch
Saiva Siddhanta Church
Sanatan Dharma Maha Sabha
Sanatan Sanstha
Santhigiri Ashram
Sathya Sai Organization
Satsang (Deoghar)
Science of Identity Foundation
Science of Spirituality (a.k.a. Sawan Kirpal Ruhani Mission)
Self-Realization Fellowship
Yogoda Satsanga Society of India
Shree Shree Anandamayee Sangha
Siddha Yoga Dham Associates Foundation
Sivananda Yoga Vedanta Centres
Society of Abidance in Truth
Sree Narayana Dharma Paripalana Yogam
Alwaye Advaita Ashram
Sree Narayana Trust
Sri Aurobindo Ashram
Auroville Foundation
Sri Aurobindo Ashram, Rewa
Sri Aurobindo International School, Hyderabad
Sri Chinmoy Centres
Sri Ramana Ashram
Sri Sri Radha Govindaji Trust
Sringeri Sharada Peetham
Swadhyay Parivar
Durga Vahini
Swaminarayan Mandir Vasna Sanstha
Vishva Hindu Parishad
Vishwa Madhwa Maha Parishat
Vishwa Nirmala Dharma
World Vaisnava Association

Islamic organizations

International
 Organisation of Islamic Cooperation

India
 Samastha
 Samastha Kerala Jem-iyyathul Ulama (EK group)
 All India Sunni Jem-iyyathul Ulama
 All India Muslim Students Federation
 All-India Muslim League
 Sunni Students Federation
 Muslim Students Federation (Kerala unit)
 Muslim Students Federation (I. U. M. L.)
 Indian Union Muslim League
  Kerala Nadvathul Mujahideen
 Jamiat Ulema-e-Hind
 Muslim Jamaat
 Dakshina Kerala Jamiyyathul Ulama
 Samastha Kerala Sunni Students Federation

Bangladesh
 Anjuman-i-Ulama-i-Bangala
 Bangladesh Jamaat-e-Islami
 Hefazat-e-Islam Bangladesh
 Islami Oikya Jote
 Islamic Foundation Bangladesh

China
 Islamic Association of China
 Islamic Association of Macau

Egypt
 Muslim Brotherhood

Great Britain
 Mosques & Imams National Advisory Board
 Islamic Forum of Europe
 Young Muslim Organisation
 Muslim Council of Britain
 British Muslim Forum
 Islamic Society of Britain
 Minhaj-ul-Quran UK
 Muslim Association of Britain
 Muslim Educational Trust
 Muslim Parliament of Great Britain
 Muslim Public Affairs Committee UK
 Sufi Muslim Council
 UK Islamic Mission
 World Islamic Mission

Hong Kong
 Chinese Muslim Cultural and Fraternal Association
 Hong Kong Islamic Youth Association
 Incorporated Trustees of the Islamic Community Fund of Hong Kong
 Islamic Cultural Association (Hong Kong)
 United Muslims Association of Hong Kong

Macau
 Islamic Association of Macau

Nigeria
 Jama'atu Nasril Islam
 Muslim Students Society of Nigeria
 Izala Society

West Bengal
 Haqqani Anjuman

India
 Jamaat-e-Islami Hind

Indonesia
Al-Irshad Al-Islamiya
Al-Mukmin Islamic school
Alkhairaat
Hidayatullah (Islamic organization)
Indonesia Institute of Islamic Dawah
Indonesian Association of Muslim Intellectuals
Indonesian Islamic Propagation Council
Indonesian Ulema Council
International Center For Islam and Pluralism
Islamic Defenders Front
Jamiat Kheir
Jaringan Islam Liberal
Majelis Rasulullah
Muhammadiyah
Aisyiyah
Muslim Students' Association (Indonesia)
Nahdlatul Ulama
Ansor Youth Movement
Banser
Nahdlatul Wathan
PERSIS (organization)
Al-Rabithah al-Alawiyyah
The Wahid Institute

Iran
 Islamic International Foundation of Cooperation

Pakistan
 Tableeghi Jamat
 Tanzeem-e-Islami
 Dawat-e-Islami
 Jamaat-e-Islami Pakistan
 Minhaj-ul-Quran
 Jamaat-ul-Muslimeen

Singapore
 Majlis Ugama Islam Singapura

Taiwan
 Chinese Islamic Cultural and Educational Foundation
 Chinese Muslim Association
 Chinese Muslim Youth League
 Taiwan Halal Integrity Development Association

Trinidad and Tobago
 Anjuman Sunnat-ul-Jamaat Association

Jewish organizations

Jewish organizations by movement affiliation

Orthodox

Haredi (ultra-Orthodox)
Edah HaChareidis
Union of Orthodox Rabbis
World Agudath Israel
Agudath Israel of America

Hasidic
Chabad
Agudas Chasidei Chabad
North Eastern US Aleph Institute
Chabad.org
Colel Chabad
Federation of Jewish Communities of the CIS
Federation of Jewish Communities of Russia
Friendship Circle (organization)
Gan Israel
Rohr Jewish Learning Institute
Jewish Learning Network
Jewish Released Time
Jewish Relief Agency
Kehot Publication Society
Lubavitch Youth Organization
Merkos L'Inyonei Chinuch
Machneh Israel (Chabad)
N'shei Chabad
National Committee for the Furtherance of Jewish Education
Ohr Avner Foundation
Tzivos Hashem
Vaad Talmidei Hatmimim Haolami
Satmar
Central Rabbinical Congress

Misnagdim
Congress of the Jewish Religious Organizations and Associations in Russia

Modern Orthodox
International Rabbinic Fellowship
Khal Adath Jeshurun
Orthodox Union
Rabbinical Council of America
Religious Zionist
Amana (organization)
Arutz Sheva
Bnei Akiva
Center for Jewish–Christian Understanding and Cooperation
Gush Emunim
Makor Rishon
Midrasha Zionit
Mizrachi (religious Zionism)
Religious Zionists of America
Ne'emanei Torah Va'Avodah
The Temple Institute

Conservadox
Union for Traditional Judaism
Institute of Traditional Judaism

Conservative
Camp Ramah
Fuchsberg Jerusalem Center for Conservative Judaism
Jewish Theological Seminary of America
List College
Rabbinical Assembly
Schechter Institute of Jewish Studies
United Synagogue of Conservative Judaism
United Synagogue Youth
Kadima (youth group)

Humanistic
Society for Humanistic Judaism

Reconstructionist
Jewish Reconstructionist Federation
Reconstructionist Rabbinical Association
Reconstructionist Rabbinical College

Reform
American Council for Judaism
World Union for Progressive Judaism
Communauté Juive Libérale
Israel Movement for Reform and Progressive Judaism
Liberal Jewish Movement of France
Liberal Judaism (United Kingdom)
Movement for Reform Judaism
Nederlands Verbond voor Progressief Jodendom
Netzer Olami
South African Union for Progressive Judaism (SAUPJ)
Union of Progressive Jews in Germany
Union for Progressive Judaism
Union for Reform Judaism
Society for Classical Reform Judaism

Messianic

 Chosen People Ministries
 Jews for Jesus
 Messianic Jewish Alliance of America
 Union of Messianic Jewish Congregations

Non-denominational
Academy for Jewish Religion (California)
Academy for Jewish Religion (New York)
Havurat Shalom
High Council of B'nei Noah
IKAR (Jewish congregation)
International Federation of Rabbis
Kabbalah Centre

Jewish organizations by purpose

Campus organizations
Chabad on Campus International Foundation
Hillel International

Educational institutions

Outreach
Aish HaTorah
Association for Jewish Outreach Programs
Chabad.org
Gateways (organization)
Kiruv Organization (Mizrachi)
Oorah (organization)
Project Genesis (organization)

Rabbinical organizations

Synagogues

Youth organizations
 
Bnei Akiva
Netzer Olami
Tzivos Hashem
United Synagogue Youth
Kadima (youth group)

Miscellaneous Jewish organizations
Chaverim (literally "Friends"), roadside assistance squads
Chesed Shel Emes (literally "Kindness of Truth"), body recovery and burial assistance 
Misaskim (literally "People who Get Involved"), services for the care of the dead and the needs of mourners
Shomrim (literally "Watchers"), neighborhood patrol
ZAKA or "Zihuy Korbanot Ason" (literally, "Disaster Victim Identification") identification of victims of terrorist, accidents, or other disasters

Meitei organizations

Lainingthou Sanamahi Temple Board

Pagan organizations
 

Church of All Worlds
Circle Sanctuary
Covenant of the Goddess
Covenant of Unitarian Universalist Pagans
European Congress of Ethnic Religions
Foundation for Traditional Religions
Pagan Federation
St. Priapus Church
Unitarian Earth Spirit Network

Caucasian
Council of Priests of Abkhazia

Baltic
Romuva

Celtic
Ar nDraiocht Fein
Dun Ailline Druid Brotherhood
Order of Bards, Ovates and Druids
Reformed Druids of North America

Chinese
Chinese Folk Temples' Management Association

Germanic
Armanen-Orden
Ásatrú Alliance
Asatru Folk Assembly
Ásatrúarfélagið
Åsatrufellesskapet Bifrost
Eldaring
Forn Siðr — Ásatrú and Vanatrú Association in Denmark
Germanische Glaubens-Gemeinschaft
Gylfilites' Guild
Heathen Front
National Socialist Kindred
Nordic Asa-Community
Odin Brotherhood
Odinic Rite
Odinist Community of Spain – Ásatrú
Samfälligheten för Nordisk Sed
Swedish Forn Sed Assembly
The Troth
Verein für germanisches Heidentum
Vigrid (Norway)

Italic
Nova Roma
Roman Traditional Movement

Slavic

Commonwealth of Pagan Communities of Siberia–Siberian Veche
Native Polish Church
Rodnover Confederation
Rodzima Wiara
Russian Public Movement "Course of Truth and Unity"
Russian Public Movement of Renaissance–Golden Age
Tezaurus Spiritual Union
Union of Slavic Native Belief Communities

Turkic

Aiyy Faith
Tengir Ordo

Wiccan
Aquarian Tabernacle Church
Church and School of Wicca
Church of Universal Eclectic Wicca
Circle Sanctuary
Covenant of the Goddess
Doreen Valiente Foundation
New Reformed Orthodox Order of the Golden Dawn
Panthean temple
The Rowan Tree Church
SpiralScouts International
Wiccan church
Witch School

Satanist organizations
The Satanic Temple
The Church of Satan
Joy of Satan Ministries

Shinto organizations
Association of Shinto Shrines

Sikh organizations

British Sikh Report
Chief Khalsa Diwan
City Sikhs
Delhi Sikh Gurdwara Management Committee
Gurudwara Khalsa Sabha, Matunga
Gurdwara Sri Guru Singh Sabha
Haryana Sikh Gurdwara Parbandhak Committee
Kamber Darbar
Khalsa Diwan Society Vancouver
Nishkam SWAT
Pakistan Sikh Council
Pakistan Sikh Gurdwara Prabandhak Committee
President of Shiromani Gurdwara Parbandhak Committee
Rashtriya Sikh Sangat
Sachkhoj Academy
Shiromani Akali Dal
Shiromani Gurdwara Parbandhak Committee
Sikhs for Justice
Sri Guru Singh Sabha
Tat Khalsa
United Sikhs
World Sikh Organization
3HO (Healthy, Happy, Holy Organization)

Sikh sects
Radha Soami
Radha Soami Satsang Beas
Radha Soami Satsang Sabha
Radha Swami Satsang, Dinod
Science of Spirituality
Sawan Kirpal Ruhani Mission

Taoist organisations
 Chinese Taoist Association
 Fung Loy Kok Institute of Taoism
 Hong Kong Taoist Association
 Singapore Taoist Federation
 Singapore Taoist Mission 
 Taoist Church of Italy

Unitarian, Universalist, and Unitarian Universalist
 International Council of Unitarians and Universalists
 Australia and New Zealand Unitarian Universalist Association
 Canadian Unitarian Council (Young Religious Unitarian Universalists)
 Deutsche Unitarier Religionsgemeinschaft
 European Unitarian Universalists
 General Assembly of Unitarian and Free Christian Churches (Unitarian Christian Association; Unitarian Earth Spirit Network)
 Unitarian Church of Transylvania
 Unitarian Universalist Association (Church of the Larger Fellowship; Church of the Younger Fellowship; Covenant of Unitarian Universalist Pagans))
 Covenant of Unitarian Universalist Pagans
 Meadville Lombard Theological School
 Starr King School for the Ministry
 Southeast Unitarian Universalist Summer Institute
 Unitarian Universalist Buddhist Fellowship
 Unitarian Universalist Christian Fellowship
 National Church of Iceland (In contact organization)
 American Unitarian Conference
 Christian Universalist Association
 The Unitarian Christian Emerging Church

Organizations of new religious movements

Aetherius Society
African Theological Archministry
Ausar Auset Society
Church of the Creator
Church of Satan
Eckankar
Elan Vital, formerly Divine Light Mission
Messiah Foundation International
Kalki Avatar Foundation
Never Ending Gardens
John Templeton Foundation
Joy of Satan Ministries
Sri Viswa Viznana Vidya Adhyatmika Peetham
Temple of Set
The Satanic Temple
Universal Life Church

New Age organizations
Association for Research and Enlightenment
The Family
Findhorn Foundation

Rosicrucian organizations
Ancient Mystical Order Rosae Crucis
Rosicrucian Fellowship

Theosophical organizations
Lucis Trust
New Acropolis
Theosophical Society Adyar
Theosophical Society Pasadena
Theosophical Society Point Loma-Covina
United Lodge of Theosophists

Interreligious organizations

 Association for Consciousness Exploration
 Center for Religion, Ethics and Social Policy
 The Becket Fund for Religious Liberty
 Berkeley Psychic Institute
 European Congress of Ethnic Religions
 Institute on Religion in an Age of Science
 Interfaith Worker Justice
 National African Religion Congress
 Partners for Sacred Places
 Sea of Faith
 Society for the Arts, Religion and Contemporary culture
 The World Peace Prayer Society

Inter-Abrahamic organizations
Center for Jewish–Christian Understanding and Cooperation
The Coexistence Trust
Faith & Values Media
International Catholic–Jewish Liaison Committee
International Council of Christians and Jews
International Fellowship of Christians and Jews
Interreligious Coordinating Council in Israel
Religious Coalition for Reproductive Choice

See also
 List of religions and spiritual traditions
 Major religious groups